Sigmund, also spelled Siegmund, is a Germanic given name with roots in proto-Germanic *segaz and *mundō, giving a rough translation of "protection through victory".

People with this name
 Sigmund Borgundvåg, Norwegian naval architect
 Sigmund Brouwer, Canadian author
 Sigmund Fraenkel, Polish-Austrian chemist
 Sigmund Freud, the Austrian-Jew psychologist
 Sigmund Freudenberger, Swiss painter
 Sigmund Hecht (1849–1925), Hungarian-born American Reform rabbi
 Sigmund Esco "Jackie" Jackson, African-American singer in the Jackson 5
 Sigmund Jähn, an East German cosmonaut
 Siegmund Klein (1902–1987}, American bodybuilder
 Sigmund Kvaløy Setreng, Norwegian philosopher and activist
 Sigmund Mifsud, Maltese musician
 Sigmund Moren, Norwegian philologist
 Sigmund Mowinckel, Norwegian professor and theologian
 Sigmund Rascher, German SS doctor
 Sigmund Romberg, a Hungarian composer
 Sigmund Ruud, Norwegian ski jumper
 Sigmund Skard, Norwegian poet
 Sigmund Sternberg, Hungarian-British businessman and philanthropist
 Sigmund Sommer, the American builder
 Sigmund von Erlach, Swiss military commander
 Sigmund von Haimhausen, Bavarian aristocrat
 Sigmund Widmer (1919-2003), a Swiss politician
 Sigmund Zois, Carniolan nobleman

Mythological and fictional characters
 Sigmund (also Siegmund), a hero in Norse mythology
 Siegmund, a focal character in Richard Wagner's Die Walküre
 Sigmund (comics), Doctor Sigmund, a Dutch comics character
 Siegmund, a fictional lance wielded by Ephraim in video game Fire Emblem: The Sacred Stones
 Sigmund the Sorcerer, a fictional character from the kids' TV show Fanboy & Chum Chum
 Sigmund, the titular sea monster of the kids' TV show from the 1970s, Sigmund and the Sea Monsters

See also
Sig (given name)
Sigmund (disambiguation), other meanings
Sigismund
Zygmunt, a list of people with the given name or surname Zygmunt, Zigmunt or Zigmund

References

English masculine given names
German masculine given names
Norwegian masculine given names
Hungarian masculine given names
Jewish given names